Peter Leško (born 23 September 1991) is a former Slovak football defender.

1. FC Tatran Prešov
Leško made his official debut for Tatran Prešov on 20 May 2012, playing full-time in a 2–1 home win against Slovan Bratislava.

External links 
 1. FC Tatran Prešov profile

References

1991 births
Living people
Place of birth missing (living people)
Association football defenders
Slovak footballers
1. FC Tatran Prešov players
FK Haniska players
TJ Rozvoj Pušovce players
FK Pohronie players
Slovak Super Liga players
2. Liga (Slovakia) players
3. Liga (Slovakia) players